Alternativa may refer to:
Alternativa (video game)
 Alternativa (Kosovo political party), a liberal political party in Kosovo
 Alternativa (Italian political party), a populist political party in Italy
 Alternativa (North Macedonian political party), an Albanian political party in North Macedonia